At the 2001 Southeast Asian Games, the athletics events were held in Kuala Lumpur, Malaysia. A total of 46 events were contested, of which 24 by male and 22 by female athletes. The track and field events were hosted at the National Stadium, Bukit Jalil, the marathons were held around Merdeka Square, and the racewalking events took place at Titiwangsa Lake Gardens.

Seven of the ten competing nations reached the medal table. Thailand, traditionally the regional leader in athletics, was the most successful nation, winning twenty-two gold medals and forty-one in total. The Philippines and Malaysia each won eight gold medals, with the Philippines edging into second with a medal haul of 23 (one more than the hosts). Indonesia and Vietnam respectively won 22 and 17 medals overall.

Three new women's events were introduced at the 21st edition of the competition: pole vault, hammer throw, and the 20 km race walk. Apart from the new events, eight previous games records were beaten at the competition, as well as 29 national records. Many champions from the 1999 edition of the tournament retained their titles: Arumugam Munusamy (men's 1500 metres) and Supriati Sutono (women's 5000 metres) won their third straight SEA Games titles, Juthaporn Krasaeyan had her third consecutive women's shot put and discus throw double, Loo Kum Zee won his fourth men's high jump gold, James Wong Tuck Yim took a fifth title in the men's discus and Nur Herman Majid extended his unbeaten run in the 110 metres hurdles to six titles.

Thailand had a sweep of the relays and several Thai athletes won multiple gold medals. Reanchai Sriharwong and Supavadee Khawpeag did the 100/200 metres sprint double on the men's and women's sides respectively, with Khawpeag breaking the Thai records in the process. Wassana Winatho won the women's 400 metres flat and hurdles, while Nattaporn Nomkanha was the men's gold medallist in the long jump and triple jump. Outside of Thailand, three other athletes topped the individual podium twice. The Philippines' Eduardo Buenavista won the 5000 m and 3000 metres steeplechase (knocking fifteen seconds off the games record in the latter). Pham Dinh Khanh Doan did a women's middle-distance double for Vietnam, while Indonesia's Supriyati Sutono improved the standards for the 5000 m and 10,000 metres, setting meet records in both.

Medal summary

Men

Women

Results

Men

100 metres
Round 1
Heat 1
Wind: -0.6 m/s

Heat 2
Wind: -0.4 m/s

Final
Wind: -0.5 m/s

200 metres
Round 1
Heat 1
Wind: -0.7 m/s

Heat 2
Wind: +0.8 m/s

Final
Wind: -0.5 m/s

400 metres
Final

800 metres
Round 1
Heat 1

Heat 2
Wind: +0.8 m/s

Final

1500 metres
Final

5000 metres
Final

10,000 metres
Final

110 metres hurdles
Final
Wind: 0.0 m/s

400 metres hurdles
Final

3000 metres steeplechase
Final

4 × 100 metres relay
Final

4 × 400 metres relay
Final

Marathon
Final

20 km walk
Final

50 km walk
Final

High jump
Final

Pole vault
Final

Long jump
Final

Triple jump
Final

Shot put
Final

Discus throw
Final

Hammer throw
Final

Javelin throw
Final

Decathlon
Summary

Women

100 metres
Round 1
Heat 1
Wind: -0.4 m/s

Heat 2
Wind: -0.4 m/s

Final
Wind: 0.0 m/s

200 metres
Final
Wind: -0.7 m/s

400 metres
Final

800 metres
Final

1500 metres
Final

5000 metres
Final

10000 metres
Final

100 metres hurdles
Final
Wind: 0.0 m/s

400 metres hurdles
Final

4 × 100 metres relay
Final

4 × 400 metres relay
Final

Marathon
Final

20 km walk
Final

High jump
Final

Pole vault
Final

Long jump
Final

Triple jump
Final

Shot put
Final

Discus throw
Final

Hammer throw
Final

Javelin throw
Final

Heptathlon
Results
100 metres hurdles

High jump

Shot put

200 metres

Long jump

Javelin throw

800 metres

Summary

National records by non-medallists
Women's discus throw:  40.15 m NR
Women's pole vault:  3.30 m =NR
Women's 20 km walk:  1:55:46 min NR
Women's 5000 metres:  19:21.15 min NR
Women's 200 metres:  25.22 sec NR
Men's 4 × 100 m relay:  43.00 sec =NR

Medal table

References

Results
Results from ASIA 2001-27 - MALAYSIA - XXI.  SEA GAMES at Kuala Lumpur / 12. – 16.09.2001. Vietnam Athletics Federation. Retrieved on 2013-04-06.

External links
Official website (archived)
Games webpage from Asian Olympic Committee
SEA Games champions at GBR Athletics

2001
Southeast Asian Games
2001 SEA Games
2001 Southeast Asian Games events